Quicksand is a Swedish crime drama streaming television series, based on the 2016 novel of the same name by Malin Persson Giolito. The first season, consisting of six episodes, was released on 5 April 2019 on Netflix and is its first Swedish-language series. The series stars Hanna Ardéhn, Felix Sandman, William Spetz, Ella Rappich, David Dencik, Reuben Sallmander, Maria Sundbom, Rebecka Hemse, Arvid Sand, Helena af Sandeberg and Anna Björk.

The series was commissioned in 2017 following the immense popularity of Giolito's novel.

Synopsis
A school shooting takes place at Djursholm senior high school. At the age of 18, Maja Norberg is arrested and suspected of murder. The protagonist admits the murder at an early stage but denies the crime – the trial is rather about why the murder was committed than whether it was committed.

Like in the novel, the story is told from the main character's perspective, with events flashing back and forth between the present day and her memories of events that led up to the shooting. The six-episode series answers the main question concerning the extent of her complicity: As the only student left alive after the shooting, did she conspire with her boyfriend who planned the attack or is she an innocent bystander? Fagerman, himself, dies in the shooting leaving Maja as the sole focus of international media attention.

Quicksand is not based on a real-life event but the story was written to reflect real-life class inequalities that its creators saw in Sweden.

Cast

Main
 Hanna Ardéhn as Maja Norberg
 Felix Sandman as Sebastian "Sibbe" Fagerman
 William Spetz as Samir Said
 Ella Rappich as Amanda Steen
 David Dencik as Peder Sander
 Reuben Sallmander as Claes Fagerman
 Maria Sundbom as Lena Pärsson
 Rebecka Hemse as Jeanette Nilsson
 Arvid Sand as Lars-Gabriel "Labbe" Sager-Crona
 Helena af Sandeberg as Mimmi Steen
 Anna Björk as Camilla Norberg

Recurring
 Iris Herngren as Lina Norberg
 Kalled Mustonen as Kalle
 Marall Nasiri as Susse Zanjani
 Christopher Wollter as Erik Norberg
 Jeanette Holmgren as Mags
 Evin Ahmad as Evin Orak
 Alva Bratt as Mela
 Louise Edlind as Majlis
 Astrid Plynning as Sofie
 Vehid Abdullahi
 Suheib Saleh as Dennis
 Sebastian Sporsén as Per Jonsson
 Shanti Roney as Christer
 Moa Lindström as classmate, funeral visitor and club visitor.
 Tom Boustedt as classmate
 Savannah Hanneryd as club visitor
 Ray Nordin as club visitor

Episodes

Production

Development
On 7 September 2017, it was announced that Netflix had given the production a series order for a first season. The series is created by Pontus Edgren and Martina Håkansson who are both credited as executive producers. In March 2019, it was confirmed that the series would premiere on 5 April 2019.

Casting
In July 2018, it was announced that Hanna Ardéhn, William Spetz, Felix Sandman, David Dencik, Reuben Sallmander, Anna Björk, Christopher Wollter, Evin Ahmad, Maria Sundbom, Rebecka Hemse, Helena af Sandeberg, Shanti Roney and Ella Rappich had been cast in the series.

Premiere
In February 2019, the series held its official premiere with the screening of the first two episodes at the Berlin International Film Festival in Berlin, Germany.

Release
On 27 March 2019, the official trailer for the series was released. On 5 April 2019, the series had its release on Netflix.

Reception
In a review of the premiere episode, Joel Keller from Decider described Quicksand as a "pretty standard crime drama, albeit one that's pretty well-written."

References

External links
 
 

2010s crime drama television series
2010s high school television series
2010s Swedish television series
2010s teen drama television series
2019 Swedish television series debuts
Television controversies in Sweden
Crime thriller television series
Mass murder in fiction
Nonlinear narrative television series
Rape in television
Serial drama television series
Swedish crime television series
Swedish drama television series
Swedish-language Netflix original programming
Television series about teenagers
Television series about dysfunctional families
Television series about bullying
Television shows based on Swedish novels
Television shows set in Stockholm